CMLL Super Viernes is professional wrestling promotion Consejo Mundial de Lucha Libre's (CMLL) Friday night wrestling show that takes place in Arena México every Friday night unless a Pay-Per-View or a major wrestling event is  scheduled to take place on that night. CMLL began holding their weekly Friday night "Super Viernes" shows as far back as 1938, with 2010 continuing the trend. Some of the matches from Super Viernes are taped for CMLL's weekly shows that air in Mexico the week following the Super Viernes show. CMLL presented 46 Super Viernes shows during 2009, originally scheduled to be 48 but the Swine Influenza epidemic of 2009 forced the cancellation of two shows, one in April and one in May. During the year Super Viernes was replaced by the 2009 Homenaje a Dos Leyendas, Infierno en el Ring, CMLL 76th Anniversary Show and Sin Salida.

Super Viernes hosted both the first ever Campeon Universal tournament and the 2009 version of the Torneo Gran Alternativa. 2009 saw Super Viernes host eight championship matches in total, with only two title changes. The two title changes both occurred in January, 2009 as the CMLL World Tag Team Championship and the Mexican National Women's Championship changed hands.

The shows featured 298 matches in total, 259 for the male division, 20 featuring the female division and 19 featuring the Mini-Estrellas. In 2009 129 different wrestlers appeared in matches during CMLL's Super Viernes shows. Of those 129 wrestlers 14 were Mini-Estrellas and 16 were women. Héctor Garza and Místico wrestled on 31 shows in total, the most of any individual wrestler, which meant they appeared on 67,3% of all the shows. La Amapola was the woman most often featured on Super Viernes with 13 matches, appearing in 65% of the women's matches booked for Super Viernes. Mascarita Dorada was the Mini-Estrella who had the most appearances, wrestling 12 times in total, or in 63,1% of all Mini-Estrella matches. Astral, Pequeno Ninja, Mima Shimoda, Rosa Negra, Star Fire. As Jr., Bronco, Cholo, Nitro, Police Man, Rene Guajardo Jr. and Camaleon all wrestled only on one Super Viernes during 2009.

Super Viernes shows of 2009

Notes

References

2009 in professional wrestling
Professional wrestling-related lists
2009